Yan Tkalich (born 1 September 2000) is a Ukrainian figure skater. He represented Ukraine at the 2017 European Youth Olympic Winter Festival.

Competitive highlights 
JGP: Junior Grand Prix

References 

Ukrainian male single skaters
2000 births
Living people
Sportspeople from Dnipro